Melville Baker (April 24, 1901 – April 10, 1958) was an American screenwriter.

Bakers was born in Massachusetts and died of a heart attack in Nice, France at the age of 56.

Selected filmography
 The Swan (1925)
 The Circus Kid (1928)
 Darkened Rooms (1929)
 One Romantic Night (1930)
 His Woman (1931)
 Zoo in Budapest (1933)
 Now and Forever (1934)
 The Gilded Lily (1935)
 Ladies in Love (1936) 
 Above Suspicion (1943)

See also
 Jack Kirkland

References

External links
 

1901 births
1958 deaths
American male screenwriters
People from Massachusetts
20th-century American male writers
20th-century American screenwriters